Martin Nguyen (born 5 March 1989) is a Vietnamese-Australian mixed martial artist, currently competes in the Featherweight division of ONE Championship, he is a former ONE Featherweight and Lightweight World Champion. As of 6 October 2022, he is ranked No. 4 in the ONE Featherweight rankings.

Background 
Nguyen was born on 5 March 1989, to Vietnamese parents but moved to Western Sydney,Australia at a young age. Attending Ashcroft Primary School and Liverpool Boys High School, Martin played representative rugby league  but after suffering constant injuries, decided he was better off away from the game. Nguyen then picked up martial arts at the age of 21, initially just to help lose weight and to find a new hobby, but soon realised he had a natural talent for it.

Mixed martial arts career

ONE Championship
In the promotional debut, Nguyen faced Rocky Batolbatol on 7 November 2014, at ONE FC: Battle of Lions. He won the fight via a rear-naked choke submission in the second round.

Nguyen faced Marat Gafurov, replacing Jadamba Narantungalag for the interim ONE Featherweight World Championship, on 27 September 2015, at ONE: Odyssey of Champions. He lost the bout via a rear-naked choke submission in the first round.

Nguyen faced Edward Kelly on 13 November 2015, at ONE: Pride of Lions. He won the fight via a doctor stoppage technical knockout in the first round.

Nguyen faced Li Kai Wen on 15 April 2016, at ONE: Global Rivals. He won the fight via technical knockout in the first round.

Nguyen faced Christian Lee on 13 August 2016, at ONE: Heroes of the World. He won the fight via a guillotine choke technical submission in the first round.

Nguyen faced Kazunori Yokota on 14 January 2017, at ONE: Quest for Power. He won the fight via knockout in the first round.

ONE Featherweight World Champion
Nguyen faced Marat Gafurov for the ONE Featherweight World Championship on 18 August 2017, at ONE: Quest for Greatness. He won the bout and title via knockout in the second round.

Nguyen faced Eduard Folayang for the ONE Lightweight World Championship on 10 November 2017, at ONE: Legends of the World. He won the bout via knockout in the second round and make his first double champion history.

Nguyen faced Bibiano Fernandes for the ONE Bantamweight World Championship on 24 March 2018, at ONE: Iron Will. He lost the bout via split decision.

In his first title defense, Nguyen faced Christian Lee on 18 May 2018, at ONE: Unstoppable Dreams. He won the bout via split decision.

Nguyen faced Kevin Belingon for the interim ONE Bantamweight World Championship on 27 July 2018, at ONE: Reign of Kings. He lost the bout via unanimous decision.

On 28 September 2018, it was announced that Nguyen vacated the ONE Lightweight World Championship due to suffering an injury in training, rendering him unable to defend the title.

In the second title defense, Nguyen faced Jadamba Narantungalag on 12 April 2019, at ONE: Roots of Honor. He won the bout via a flying knee knockout in the second round.

In the third title defense, Nguyen faced Koyomi Matsushima on 2 August 2019, at ONE: Dawn of Heroes. He won the bout via technical knockout in the second round.

Nguyen defense the title against Thanh Le on 30 October 2020, at ONE: Inside the Martix. He lost the bout and title via technical knockout in the third round.

Post-championship reign
Nguyen was scheduled to face Kim Jae Woong on 7 April 2021 and aired on 14 April 2021, at ONE on TNT 2. However, Nguyen was forced to withdrew due to has not been cleared to compete health and safety protocols. The pair was rescheduled for ONE: Revolution on 24 September 2021. He lost the fight via knockout in the first round.

Nguyen faced Kirill Gorobets on 11 March 2022, at ONE: Lights Out. He won the fight via technical knockout in the third round.

Nguyen faced Ilya Freymanov on 1 October 2022, at ONE on Prime Video 2. He lost the fight via TKO (submission to knees) in the first round.

Nguyen was scheduled to face Shamil Gasanov on 25 February 2023, at ONE Fight Night 7. However, Gasanov was forced to withdrew due to an infection that stemmed from an injury. He was replaced by Razhab Shaydullaev. In turn, Shaydullaev was forced to withdraw due to undisclosed reasons and was replaced by Leonardo Casotti. He won the fight via unanimous decision.

Personal life 
Martin is married to Brooke Nguyen, and the couple have three children together, Kai, Tiarna, and Madison.

Championships and accomplishments 
ONE Championship
ONE Featherweight World Championship (One time)
Three successful title defenses
ONE Lightweight World Championship (One time)
First multi-divisional champion in ONE history
BRACE
Brace Featherweight Championship (One time)

Mixed martial arts record 

|-
|Win
|align=center| 15–6
|Leonardo Casotti
|Decision (unanimous)
|ONE Fight Night 7
|
|align=center| 3
|align=center| 5:00
|Bangkok, Thailand 
|
|-
|Loss
|align=center| 14–6
|Ilya Freymanov
|TKO (submission to knees)
|ONE on Prime Video 2
|
|align=center| 1
|align=center| 3:33
|Kallang, Singapore 
|
|-
|Win
|align=center| 14–5
|Kirill Gorobets
|TKO (punches)
|ONE: Lights Out
|
|align=center| 3
|align=center| 2:18
|Kallang, Singapore
|
|-
|Loss
|align=center| 13–5
|Kim Jae Woong 
|KO (punches)
|ONE: Revolution
|
|align=center| 1
|align=center| 3:15
|Kallang, Singapore 
|
|-
|Loss
|align=center| 13–4
|Thanh Le
|TKO (punches)
|ONE: Inside the Martix
|
|align=center| 3
|align=center| 2:19
|Kallang, Singapore 
|
|-
|Win
|align=center| 13–3
|Koyomi Matsushima
|TKO (punches)
|ONE: Dawn of Heroes
|
|align=center| 2
|align=center| 4:40
|Pasay, Philippines 
|
|-
|Win
|align=center| 12–3
|Jadamba Narantungalag
|KO (flying knee)
|ONE: Roots of Honor
|
|align=center| 2
|align=center| 1:07
|Pasay, Philippines 
|
|-
|Loss
|align=center| 11–3
|Kevin Belingon
|Decision (unanimous)
|ONE: Reign of Kings
|
|align=center| 5
|align=center| 5:00
|Pasay, Philippines 
|
|-
|Win
|align=center| 11–2
|Christian Lee
|Decision (split)
|ONE: Unstoppable Dreams
|
|align=center| 5
|align=center| 5:00
|Kallang, Singapore 
|
|-
|Loss
|align=center| 10–2
|Bibiano Fernandes
|Decision (split)
|ONE: Iron Will
|
|align=center| 5
|align=center| 5:00
|Bangkok, Thailand
|
|-
|Win
|align=center| 10–1
|Eduard Folayang
|KO (punch)
|ONE: Legends of the World
|
|align=center| 2
|align=center| 2:20
|Pasay, Philippines 
|
|-
|Win
|align=center| 9–1
|Marat Gafurov
|KO (punch)
|ONE: Quest for Greatness
|
|align=center| 2
|align=center| 1:27
|Kuala Lumpur, Malaysia 
|
|-
|Win
|align=center| 8–1
|Kazunori Yokota
|KO (punches)
|ONE: Quest for Power
|
|align=center| 1
|align=center| 3:36
|Jakarta, Indonesia 
|
|-
|Win
|align=center| 7–1
|Christian Lee
|Technical Submission (guillotine choke)
|ONE: Heroes of the World
|
|align=center| 1
|align=center| 4:30
|Macau, SAR, China
|
|-
|Win
|align=center| 6–1
|Li Kai Wen
|TKO (punches)
|ONE: Global Rivals
|
|align=center| 1
|align=center| 4:44
|Pasay, Philippines 
|
|-
|Win
|align=center| 5–1
|Edward Kelly
|TKO (doctor stoppage)
|ONE: Pride of Lions
|
|align=center| 1
|align=center| 4:17
|Kallang, Singapore 
|
|-
|Loss
|align=center| 4–1
|Marat Gafurov
|Submission (rear-naked choke)
|ONE: Odyssey of Champions
|
|align=center| 1
|align=center| 0:41
|Jakarta, Indonesia 
|
|-
|Win
|align=center| 4–0
|Rocky Batolbatol
|Submission (rear-naked choke)
|ONE FC: Battle of Lions
|
|align=center| 2
|align=center| 2:10
|Kallang, Singapore 
|
|-
|Win
|align=center| 3–0
|Luke Standing
|TKO (punches)
|BRACE 24
|
|align=center| 1
|align=center| 3:30
|Canberra, Australia 
|
|-
|Win
|align=center| 2–0
|Thomas Ruderman
|TKO (punches)
|BRACE 18
|
|align=center| 2
|align=center| N/A
|Canberra, Australia 
|
|-
|Win
|align=center| 1–0
|Richard Kemp-Hay
|Submission (rear-naked choke)
|Cage Conquest 1
|
|align=center| 3
|align=center| 1:39
|Nowra, New South Wales, Australia 
|

See also 
List of current ONE fighters
List of male mixed martial artists

References

External links
 Martin Nguyen at ONE

1989 births
Living people
Australian male mixed martial artists
Featherweight mixed martial artists
Lightweight mixed martial artists
People from Sydney
Sportspeople from Sydney
ONE Championship champions
Australian people of Vietnamese descent